The Agana Spanish Bridge is a stone arch bridge built in 1800 in Hagåtña, Guam (formerly known as Agana), during the administration of Spanish governor Manuel Muro.  It is the only surviving Spanish bridge in Hagåtña, which is the capital of the United States territory of Guam.  Also known as Sagon I Tolai Acho, it is located at the southwest corner of Aspenall St. and Rte. 1 and was listed on the U.S. National Register of Historic Places in 1974.

Originally it crossed the Hagåtña River, which had been diverted, and it connected the San Ignacio district to the Bilibic district.  The bridge was damaged in bombardment during the U.S. recapture of Guam from Japan in 1944.  The Hagåtña River was rechanneled elsewhere, later;  the site became a park and the bridge was restored in 1966.  The restoration included replacing portions of the bridge by a "stylized concrete wall".  A rectangular cement pond area replaced the former riverbed under the bridge.

See also
National Register of Historic Places listings in Guam

References

External links
 

Road bridges on the National Register of Historic Places in Guam
Bridges completed in 1800
Bridges in Guam
Buildings and structures in Hagåtña, Guam
1800s establishments in the Spanish East Indies
1800s establishments in Oceania
19th-century establishments in Guam
Stone arch bridges in the United States